Brookland-Cayce High School is a public high school located in Cayce, South Carolina, United States.

History
The school was built in 1932.  Named for the cities of Brookland (now West Columbia) and Cayce which it originally served, the school now serves parts of West Columbia, Cayce, South Congaree, Pine Ridge, and Gaston. It is a part of the Lexington County School District Two. When the high school first opened it was a segregated school. Brookland and Cayce were schools for whites. Over the years the schools joined together.

It was founded in order to serve the communities across the Congaree River from Columbia.

Notable alumni 
Kip Bouknight, Major League pitcher
Mike Derrick, Major League baseball player
Dakota Dozier, American football player
Bruce Littlefield, author
Curtis Loftis, State Treasurer of South Carolina
Ike Okoli, beach wrestler
Jeff Twitty, Major League Baseball pitcher
Dooley Womack, Major League Baseball pitcher

References 

 Mission Statement, School's website.

External links

Public high schools in South Carolina
Schools in Lexington County, South Carolina